The Milnes baronetcy, of Gauley in the County of Leicester, was a title in the Baronetage of the United Kingdom. It was created on 21 March 1801 for the colonial governor Robert Milnes. The title became extinct on the death of the invalid second Baronet in 1839, the only surviving son, "after many years in delicate and precarious health" residing at Sydling.

Richard Milnes, uncle of the first Baronet, was the great-great-grandfather of Richard Monckton Milnes, 1st Baron Houghton.

Milnes baronets, of Gauley (1801)
Sir Robert Shore Milnes, 1st Baronet (1747–1837)
Sir John Bentinck Milnes, 2nd Baronet (1786–1839)

See also
Marquess of Crewe
Milnes Coates baronets

References

Extinct baronetcies in the Baronetage of the United Kingdom